Hit or Miss may refer to:
 Hit or Miss (solitaire)
 "Hit or Miss" (The Damned song), 1980
 "Hit or Miss" (Jacob Sartorius song), 2016
 "Hit or Miss" (New Found Glory song), 1999
 "Hit or Miss", a 1970 song by Odetta from Odetta Sings
 "Hit or Miss”, a common nickname for iLoveFriday's 2018 song "Mia Khalifa"
 Hit-or-miss transform, a mathematical operation

See also 
 Hit and miss (disambiguation)